Stuart Little (also known as Stuart Little: The Animated Series) is an American animated television series, loosely based on the 1945 E. B. White children's book Stuart Little, as well as the live-action / computer-animated film adaptations. It was produced by Red Wagon Entertainment and Sony Pictures Television for the HBO Family digital cable television channel and aired for one season of 13 episodes.

Premise
The series focuses on the adventures of Stuart Little and his family.

Voice cast

 David Kaufman as Stuart Little, a young anthropomorphic mouse adopted as part of the Little family. 
 Quinton Flynn and Kevin Schon as Snowbell, the family's Persian cat who is Stuart's friend.
 Myles Jeffrey as George Little, the eldest son of the Little family and Stuart's older brother.
 Hugh Laurie as Mr. Frederick Little, the father of the Little family and Eleanor's husband.
 Jennifer Hale as 
 Mrs. Eleanor Little, the mother of the Little family and Frederick's wife.
 Martha Little, the infant daughter of the Little family and Stuart and George's younger sister.
 André Sogliuzzo as Monty, Snowbell's gray tabby cat friend.
 Matt Kaminsky as Rick Ruckus, a pro skater whom George and Stuart are big fans of.
 Kathy Najimy as Margalo, a young anthropomorphic canary who is Stuart's love interest.
 Pat Fraley as Falcon, a sadistic, greedy peregrine falcon. 
 Jeffrey Jones as Uncle Crenshaw Little, the older brother of Frederick Little.
 Marc John Jefferies as Will Wilson, George's loyal best friend.

With the exceptions of Laurie, Jones, and Jefferies, none of the actors from the films reprised their roles. Daniel Hansen who previously portrayed an unnamed student in Stuart Little 2 voices Larry Gronk.

Episodes

Home media
Two DVDs were released on May 22, 2007. Each contained 3 episodes of Stuart Little. In April 2009, two more DVDs were released.

References

External links
  (Archived Site)
 

HBO original programming
2003 American television series debuts
2003 American television series endings
2000s American animated television series
American children's animated adventure television series
American children's animated comedy television series
American sequel television series
American television shows based on children's books
Animated television shows based on films
Television series based on adaptations
Television series by Sony Pictures Television
Animated television series about families
Animated television series about mice and rats
English-language television shows
Television shows set in New York City
Stuart Little (franchise)
Television series by Adelaide Productions